Himley is a small village and civil parish in the English ceremonial county of Staffordshire, situated 4 miles west of Dudley and 5 miles southwest of Wolverhampton. At the time of the 2011 Census, Himley had a population of 802.It is most notable for being the location of Himley Hall, the former home of the Lords of Dudley.

History
Himley parish became part of Seisdon Union following the Poor Law Amendment Act of 1834, and later the Seisdon Rural District until 1974, when it became part of the newly formed South Staffordshire district. Despite these administrative boundaries, Himley Hall is owned by Dudley Metropolitan Borough Council. Located next to Himley Hall is St. Michael's Church, the only church in the village, which was erected in 1764 and is a Grade II listed building. Most recent Earls of Dudley are interred in a private burial ground at the rear of Himley's parish church.

Transport
Himley is situated off the intersection of the main A449 road between Wolverhampton and Kidderminster, and the B4176 road between Dudley and Telford, which includes the village’s bypass opened in July 1988. Bus routes  National Express West Midlands 15/15a from Wolverhampton to Merry Hill Shopping Centre serve Himley village. Service 15 runs every 30 minutes during Monday to Saturday daytimes, hourly at other times except for Sunday daytimes when service 15A operates, the latter omitting Wombourne village. Late night journeys also operate. 

Between 1925 and 1932, there was a railway station known as Himley railway station on the Wombourne Branch Line, which opened as a goods line in 1911 but was only open for just over half a century. It was operated by the Great Western Railway. A picnic area now stands on the site of the station, forming part of the 10-mile Kingswinford Railway Walk.

Places of interest

Regular events take place at Himley Hall such as wedding functions and exhibitions, as well as local council-organised firework displays. Himley Golf Club, located within the grounds of Himley Hall, is open to the public.

The Old Rectory, built , is almost as big as the St. Michael's Church behind it. The building, which had been sold by the Church of England in the 1950s, is now a private residence and is briefly mentioned in Nikolaus Pevsner’s ‘Buildings of Staffordshire’. When the building was still a working rectory, its garden was once visited by Mary of Teck – Queen consort as the wife of George V. The rectory for the parish is now in Swindon.

There are two parks in Himley: the main park located within the boundaries of Himley Hall; and a second smaller park located on School Road.

The Crooked House pub is just within the boundaries of Himley parish.

The grounds of Himley Cricket Club have held one Twenty20 match for Worcestershire.

See also
Listed buildings in Himley

References

External links
 Website of Dudley Metropolitan Borough Council

Villages in Staffordshire
Civil parishes in Staffordshire